Carl S. Bates (January 1, 1884 – August 27, 1956) was an aviation pioneer from Clear Lake, Iowa. He piloted gliders in 1899, and in 1906 he designed a gasoline-powered airplane that was equipped with an air-cooled engine, a metal propeller and metal wing rudders.

Biography
Bates was the first person in 
Iowa to fly a heavier-than-air aircraft. He also built, flew and sold several aircraft and plans. Foundations of the modern hang gliding movement are traced in part to the popular Chanute style biplane that he spread with his articles to the public, as well as providing plans for homebuilders to build the biplane hang glider. 

In 1898 at age 14, Bates built and flew a hang glider.

In April 1909, he authored a Popular Science how-to article on hang glider construction.

In 1911, Bates designed a built and monoplane with an engine of his own design. 

In 1912, Bates sold his company, the Bates Aeroplane Co, to Edward Bayard Heath.

Bates died in 1956.

Legacy
In 2002 Carl S. Bates was inducted in the Iowa Aviation Hall of Fame.

References

External links
Carl Sterling Bates
Carl Bates See gravestone.
Bates' Popular Mechanics Glider plan as presented in a separate publication The Boy Mechanic. 
How to Build a Glider
Biography 
Aerofiles Article by Carl S. Bates, describing how to build a [hang glider].

See also 
History of hang gliding
Ultralight aviation
Biplane

Hang gliding
Members of the Early Birds of Aviation
1884 births
1956 deaths
People from Clear Lake, Iowa